John Isner and Jack Sock defeated Santiago González and Édouard Roger-Vasselin in the final, 7–6(7–4), 6–3, to win the men's doubles tennis title at the 2022 Indian Wells Masters.
The victory earned Isner his second doubles title at Indian Wells, Sock his third, and the pair's second together overall at the tournament.

John Peers and Filip Polášek were the defending champions, but lost to Marcelo Arévalo and Jean-Julien Rojer in the first round.

Mate Pavić and Joe Salisbury were in contention for the world no. 1 doubles ranking at the beginning of the tournament. Pavić retained the top ranking, despite losing in the first round, after Salisbury lost in the semifinals.

Seeds

Draw

Finals

Top half

Bottom half

Seeded teams

The following are the seeded teams, based on ATP rankings as of March 7, 2022.

Other entry information

Wildcards

Protected ranking
  Santiago González /  Édouard Roger-Vasselin

Withdrawals 
  Simone Bolelli /  Máximo González → replaced by  Simone Bolelli /  Fabio Fognini
  Dan Evans /  Cristian Garín → replaced by  Dan Evans /  Karen Khachanov
  Sander Gillé /  Joran Vliegen → replaced by  Sander Gillé /  Matwé Middelkoop

References

External links
 Main draw

BNP Paribas Open – Men's doubles
Doubles men